Typescript may refer to:

 Manuscript that was typewritten
 Script (Unix), a Unix command for recording terminal session whose output is referred to as typescript
 TypeScript, a programming language